Juan Almenar was a Spanish physician of the 15th century, and author of one of the first books on syphilis, De lue venerea sive de morbo gallico (Venice, 1502). He was born in Valencia.

Works
 Libellus ad evitandum et expellendum morbum Gallicum, Italian books before 1601. 
 Opusculum perutile de curatione morbi (ut vulgo dici solet) Gallici, 1528. 
 Libelli duo de morbo Gallico : opusculum perutile de curatione morbi (ut vulgo dici solet) gallici [Libellus ad evitandum et expellendum morborum Gallicum], Lugduni, 1529. 
 Liber de morbo Gallico in quo diversi in tali materia scribentes medicinae continentur auctores. [5], Libellus de morbo Gallico, qui ita perfecte eradicare ipsum ostendit, ut numquam revertatur, 1535.

References

Medieval Spanish physicians
15th-century Spanish physicians
Year of birth unknown
Year of death unknown